Martin Coiteux is a Canadian politician in Quebec, who was elected to the National Assembly of Quebec in the 2014 election. He represented the electoral district of Nelligan as a member of the Quebec Liberal Party. He did not run for re-election in 2018 election.

Prior to his election to the legislature, Coiteux was a senior economist with the Bank of Canada.

He holds a BSc in economics from the University of Sherbrooke, a master's in economics from Queens University, and a PhD in international economics from the Graduate Institute of International and Development Studies, in Geneva.

From 2014 to 2016 he served as President of the Treasury Board and since 2016 as Minister of Public Safety, Municipalities and responsible for Montreal.

On January 17, 2019, la Caisse de dépôt et placement du Québec announced the nomination of Martin Coiteux as the institution's chief economist.

References

Quebec Liberal Party MNAs
Living people
French Quebecers
Politicians from Montreal
Canadian economists
Graduate Institute of International and Development Studies alumni
People from Sorel-Tracy
1962 births
21st-century Canadian politicians
Members of the Executive Council of Quebec